Ethilla is a genus of flies in the family Tachinidae.

Species
E. aemula (Meigen, 1824)

References

Diptera of Europe
Diptera of Asia
Exoristinae
Tachinidae genera
Taxa named by Jean-Baptiste Robineau-Desvoidy